The phonology of Sesotho and those of the other Sotho–Tswana languages are radically different from those of "older" or more "stereotypical" Bantu languages. Modern Sesotho in particular has very mixed origins (due to the influence of Difaqane refugees) inheriting many words and idioms from non-Sotho–Tswana languages.

There are in total 39 consonantal phonemes (plus 2 allophones) and 9 vowel phonemes (plus two close raised allophones). The consonants include a rich set of affricates and palatal and postalveolar consonants, as well as three click consonants.

Historical sound changes
Probably the most radical sound innovation in the Sotho–Tswana languages is that the Proto-Bantu prenasalized consonants have become simple stops and affricates. Thus isiZulu words such as entabeni ('on the mountain'), impuphu ('flour'), ezinkulu ('the big ones'), ukulanda ('to fetch'), ukulamba ('to become hungry'), and ukuthenga ('to buy') are cognates to Sesotho  thabeng,  phofo,  tse kgolo,  ho lata,  ho lapa, and  ho reka, respectively (with the same meanings).

This is further intensified by the law of nasalization and nasal homogeneity, making derived and imported words have syllabic nasals followed by homogeneous consonants, instead of prenasalized consonants.

In certain respects, however, Sesotho is more conservative than other Sotho–Tswana languages.

The existence of (lightly) ejective consonants (all unvoiced unaspirated stops) is very strange for a Bantu language and is thought to be due to Khoisan influence. These consonants occur in the Sotho–Tswana and Nguni languages (being over four times more common in Southern Africa than anywhere else in the world), and the ejective quality is strongest in isiXhosa, which has been greatly influenced by Khoisan phonology.

As with most other Bantu languages, almost all palatal and postalveolar consonants are due to some form of palatalization or other related phenomena which result from a (usually palatal) approximant or vowel being "absorbed" into another consonant (with a possible subsequent nasalization).

The Southern Bantu languages have lost the Bantu distinction between long and short vowels. In Sesotho the long vowels have simply been shortened without any other effects on the syllables; while sequences of two dissimilar vowels have usually resulted in the first vowel being "absorbed" into the preceding consonant, and causing changes such as labialization and palatalization.

These usually behave as two phonemes (conditioned by vowel harmony), although there are enough exceptions to justify the claim that they have become four separate phonemes in the Sotho–Tswana languages.

Additionally, the first-degree (or "superclose", "heavy") and second-degree vowels have not merged as in many other Bantu languages, resulting in a total of 9 phonemic vowels.

Almost uniquely among the Sotho–Tswana languages, Sesotho has adopted clicks. There is one place of articulation, alveolar, and three manners and phonations: tenuis, aspirated, and nasalized. These most probably came with loanwords from the Khoisan and Nguni languages, though they also exist in various words which don't exist in these languages and in various ideophones.

These clicks also appear in environments which are rare or non-existent in the Nguni and Khoisan languages, such as a syllabic nasal followed by a nasalized click ( written , as in  nnqane 'that other side'), a syllabic nasal followed by a tenuis click (also written , as in  senqanqane 'frog'; this is not the same as the prenasalized radical click written  in the Nguni languages), and a syllabic nasal followed by an aspirated click ( written , as in  seqhenqha 'hunk').

Vowels

Sesotho has a large inventory of vowels compared with many other Bantu languages. However, the nine phonemic vowels are collapsed into only five letters in the Sesotho orthography. The two close vowels i and u (sometimes called "superclose" or "first-degree" by Bantuists) are very high (with advanced tongue root) and are better approximated by French vowels than English vowels.

Consonants
The Sotho–Tswana languages are peculiar among the Bantu family in that most do not have any prenasalized consonants and have a rather-large number of heterorganic compounds. Sesotho, uniquely among the recognised and standardised Sotho–Tswana languages, also has click consonants, which were acquired from Khoisan and Nguni languages.

Dialectical evidence shows that in the Sotho–Tswana languages  was originally pronounced as a retroflex flap  before the two close vowels.

Sesotho makes a three-way distinction between lightly ejective, aspirated and voiced stops in several places of articulation.

Sesotho possesses four simple nasal consonants. All of these can be syllabic and the syllabic velar nasal may also appear at the end of words.

The following approximants occur.

Note that when  appears as part of a syllable onset this actually indicates that the consonant is labialized.

The following fricatives occur. The glottal fricative is often voiced between vowels, making it barely noticeable. The alternative orthography used for the velar fricative is due to some loanwords from Afrikaans and ideophones which were historically pronounced with velar fricatives, distinct from the velar affricate. The voiced postalveolar affricative sometimes occurs as an alternative to the fricative.

There is one trill consonant. Originally, this was an alveolar rolled lingual, but today most individuals pronounce it at the back of the tongue, usually at the uvular position. The uvular pronunciation is largely attributed to the influence of French missionaries at Morija in Lesotho. Just like the French version, the position of this consonant is somewhat unstable and often varies even in individuals, but it generally differs from the "r"'s of most other South African language communities. The most stereotypical French-like pronunciations are found in certain rural areas of Lesotho, as well as some areas of Soweto (where this has affected the pronunciation of Tsotsitaal).

Sesotho has a relatively large number of affricates. The velar affricate, which was standard in Sesotho until the early 20th century, now only occurs in some communities as an alternative to the more common velar fricative.

The following click consonants occur. In common speech they are sometimes substituted with dental clicks. Even in standard Sesotho the nasal click is usually substituted with the tenuis click.  is also used to indicate a syllabic nasal followed by an ejective click, while  is used for a syllabic nasal followed by a nasal click.

The following heterorganic compounds occur. They are often substituted with other consonants, although there are a few instances when some of them are phonemic and not just allophonic. These are not considered consonant clusters.

In non-standard speech these may be pronounced in a variety of ways. bj may be pronounced  (followed by a palatal glide) and pj may be pronounced . pj may also sometimes be pronounced , which may alternatively be written ptj, though this is not to be considered standard.

Syllable structure

Sesotho syllables tend to be open, with syllabic nasals and the syllabic approximant l also allowed. Unlike almost all other Bantu languages, Sesotho does not have prenasalized consonants (NC).

The onset may be any consonant (C), a labialized consonant (Cw), an approximant (A), or a vowel (V).
The nucleus may be a vowel, a syllabic nasal (N), or the syllabic l (L).
No codas are allowed.

The possible syllables are:
V ho etsa ('to do') 
CV fi! ('ideophone of sudden darkness') 
CwV ho tswa ('to emerge') 
AV  wena ('you') 
N nna ('I') 
L lebollo ('circumcision rite') 
Note that heterorganic compounds count as single consonants, not consonant clusters.

Additionally, the following phonotactic restrictions apply:
A consonant may not be followed by the palatal approximant  (i.e. C+y is not a valid onset).
Neither the labio-velar approximant  nor a labialized consonant may  be followed by a back vowel at any time.

Syllabic l occurs only due to a vowel being elided between two ls:
  *molelo (Proto-Bantu *mu-dido) >  mollo ('fire') (cf Setswana molelo, isiZulu umlilo)
  *ho lela (Proto-Bantu *-dida) >  ho lla ('to cry') (cf Setswana go lela, isiXhosa ukulila, Tshivenda u lila)
 isiZulu ukuphuma ('to emerge') > ukuphumelela ('to succeed') > Sesotho  ho phomella

There are no contrastive long vowels in Sesotho, the rule being that juxtaposed vowels form separate syllables (which may sound like long vowels with undulating tones during natural fast speech). Originally there might have been a consonant between vowels which was eventually elided that prevented coalescence or other phonological processes (Proto-Bantu *g, and sometimes *j).

Other Bantu languages have rules against vowel juxtaposition, often inserting an intermediate approximant if necessary.
 Sesotho  Gauteng ('Gauteng') > isiXhosa Erhawudeni

Phonological processes

Vowels and consonants very often influence one another resulting in predictable sound changes. Most of these changes are either vowels changing vowels, nasals changing consonants, or approximants changing consonants. The sound changes are nasalization, palatalization, alveolarization, velarization, vowel elision, vowel raising, and labialization. Sesotho nasalization and vowel-raising are extra-strange since, unlike most processes in most languages, they actually decrease the sonority of the phonemes.Nasalization (alternatively Nasal permutation or Strengthening) is a process in Bantu languages by which, in certain circumstances, a prefixed nasal becomes assimilated to a succeeding consonant and causes changes in the form of the phone to which it is prefixed.

In Sesotho it is a fortition process and usually occurs in the formation of class 9 and 10 nouns, in the use of the objectival concord of the first person singular, in the use of the adjectival and enumerative concords of some noun classes, and in the forming of reflexive verbs (with the reflexive prefix).

Very roughly speaking, voiced consonants become devoiced and fricatives (except  ) lose their fricative quality.

Voiced stops become ejective:
  >  
  >  
Fricatives become aspirated:
  > 
  > 
  > 
   > 
  >  (except with adjectives)
 becomes 
 becomes 

The syllabic nasal causing the change is usually dropped, except for monosyllabic stems and the first person objectival concord. Reflexive verbs don't show a nasal.

  ho araba ('to answer') >  karabo ('response'),  ho nkaraba ('to answer me'), and  ho ikaraba ('to answer oneself')
  ho fa ('to give') >  mpho ('gift'),  ho mpha ('to give me'), and  ho ipha ('to give oneself')

Other changes may occur due to contractions in verb derivations:
  ho bona ('to see') >  ho bontsha ('to cause to see') (causative  -bon- +  -isa)Nasal homogeneity consists of two points:
When a consonant is preceded by a (visible or invisible) nasal it will undergo nasalization, if it supports it.
When a nasal is immediately followed by another consonant with no vowel betwixt them, the nasal will change to a nasal in the same approximate position as the following consonant, after the consonant has undergone nasal permutation. If the consonant is already a nasal then the previous nasal will simply change to the same.Palatalization is a process in certain Bantu languages where a consonant becomes a palatal consonant.

In Sesotho it usually occurs with the short form of passive verbs and the diminutives of nouns, adjectives, and relatives.

Labials:
  >  / 
  >  / 
  >  / 
  >  / 
Alveolars:
  > 
  > 
  > 
The nasals become :

For example:
  ho lefa ('to pay') >  ho lefjwa /  ho leshwa ('to be paid')Alveolarization is a process whereby a consonant becomes an alveolar consonant. It occurs in noun diminutives, the diminutives of colour adjectives, and in the pronouns and concords of noun classes with a  di- or  di[N]- prefix.

Examples:
  -kgwadi ('black with white spots') >  -kgwatsana (diminutive)
  diketso tsa hao ('your actions')

Other changes may occur due to phonological interactions in verbal derivatives:
  ho botsa ('to ask') >  ho botsetsa ('to ask on behalf of') (applied  -bots- +  -ela)

It's regularly applied in the formation of some class 8 and 10 concords and in numerous verbal derivatives.Velarization in Sesotho is a process whereby certain sounds become velar consonants due to the intrusion of an approximant. It occurs with verb passives, noun diminutives, the diminutives of relatives, and the formation of some class 1 and 3 prefixes.

 becomes 
 becomes 

For example:
  ho senya ('to destroy') >  ho senngwa ('to be destroyed') (short passive  -seny- +  -wa)
 Class 1  mo- +  -aha >  ngwaha ('year') (cf Kiswahili mwaka; from Proto-Bantu *-jaka)Elision of vowels occurs in Sesotho less often than in those Bantu languages which have vowel "pre-prefixes" before the noun class prefixes (such as isiZulu), but there are still instances where it regularly and actively occurs.

There are two primary types of regular vowel elision:
This actively occurs with verbs, and has historically occurred with some nouns.

For example:
  -bala ('read') >  -balla (applied verb suffix  -ela) ('read for'), and  mmadi ('person who reads')Vowel raising is an uncommon form of vowel harmony where a non-open vowel (i.e. any vowel other than ) is raised in position by a following vowel (in the same phonological word) at a higher position. The first variety — in which the open-mid vowels become close-mid — is commonly found in most Southern African Bantu languages (where the Proto-Bantu "mixed" vowels have separated). In the 9-vowel Sotho–Tswana languages, a much less common process also occurs where the near-close vowels become raised to a position slightly lower than the close vowels (closer to the English beat and boot than the very high Sesotho vowels i and u) without ATR (or, alternatively, with both [+ATR] and [+RTR]).Mid vowel raising is a process where  becomes  and  becomes  under the influence of close vowels or consonants that contain "hidden" close vowels.

 ho tsheha‡ ('to laugh')  > ho tshehisa‡ ('to cause to laugh') 
 ke a bona‡ ('I see')  > ke bone‡ ('I saw') 
 ho kena‡ ('to enter')  > ho kenya‡ ('to insert') 

These changes are usually recursive to varying depths within the word, though, being a left spreading rule, it is often bounded by the difficulty of "foreseeing" the raising syllable:
 diphoofolo‡ ('animals')  > diphoofolong‡ ('by the animals') 

Additionally, a right-spreading form occurs when a close-mid vowel is on the penultimate syllable (that is, the stressed syllable) and, due to some inflection or derivational process, is followed by an open-mid vowel. In this case the vowel on the final syllable is raised.

 -besa ('roast')  > subjunctive ke bese ('so I may roast...') 
but
 -thola ('find')  > subjunctive ke thole ('so I may find...') 

These vowels can occur phonemically, however, and may thus be considered to be separate phonemes:
 maele ('wisdom') 
 ho retla ('to dismantle') Close vowel raising is a process which occurs under much less common circumstances. Unlike the mid vowel raising this processes is not iterative and is only caused directly by the close vowels (it cannot be caused by any hidden vowels or by other raised vowels).

  ho tshela ('to pass over') >  ho tshedisa ('to comfort')
  ho loma ('to itch') >  selomi ('period pains')
Since these changes are allophonic, the Sotho–Tswana languages are rarely said to have 11 vowels.Labialization''' is a modification of a consonant due to the action of a bilabial  element which persists throughout the articulation of the consonant and is not merely a following semivowel. This labialization results in the consonant being pronounced with rounded lips (but, in Sesotho, with no velarization) and with attenuated high frequencies (especially noticeable with fricatives and aspirated consonants).

It may be traced to an original  or  being "absorbed" into the preceding consonant when the syllable is followed by another vowel. The consonant is labialized and the transition from the labialized syllable onset to the nucleus vowel sounds like a bilabial semivowel (or, alternatively, like a diphthong). Unlike in languages such as Chishona and Tshivenda, Sesotho labialization does not result in "whistling" of any consonants.

Additionally, syllabic nasals (where nasalization results in a labialized  instead) and the syllabic  (which is always followed by the non-syllabic ) are never directly labialized. Note that the unvoiced heterorganic doubled articulant fricative  only occurs labialized (only as ).

Due to the inherent bilabial semivowel, labialized consonants never appear before back vowels:
  ho latswa ('to taste') >  tatso ('flavour')
  ho tswa ('to emerge') >  letso ('a derivation')
  ho nwa ('to drink') >  seno ('a beverage')
  ho elellwa ('to realise') >  kelello ('the mind')

Tonology

Sesotho is a tonal language spoken using two contrasting tones: low and high; further investigation reveals, however, that in reality it is only the high tones that are explicitly specified on the syllables in the speaker's mental lexicon, and that low tones appear when a syllable is tonally under-specified. Unlike the tonal systems of languages such as Mandarin, where each syllable basically has an immutable tone, the tonal systems of the Niger–Congo languages are much more complex in that several "tonal rules" are used to manipulate the underlying high tones before the words may be spoken, and this includes special rules ("melodies") which, like grammatical or syntax rules that operate on words and morphemes, may change the tones of specific words depending on the meaning one wishes to convey.

Stress

The word stress system of Sesotho (often called "penultimate lengthening" instead, though there are certain situations where it doesn't fall on the penultimate syllable) is quite simple. Each complete Sesotho word has exactly one main stressed syllable.

Except for the second form of the first demonstrative pronoun, certain formations involving certain enclitics, polysyllabic ideophones, most compounds, and a handful of other words, there is only one main stress falling on the penult.

The stressed syllable is slightly longer and has a falling tone. Unlike in English, stress does not affect vowel quality or height.

This type of stress system occurs in most of those Eastern and Southern Bantu languages which have lost contrastive vowel length.

The second form of the first demonstrative pronoun has the stress on the final syllable. Some proclitics can leave the stress of the original word in place, causing the resultant word to have the stress at the antepenultimate syllable (or even earlier, if the enclitics are compounded). Ideophones, which tend to not obey the phonetic laws which the rest of the language abides by, may also have irregular stress.

There is even at least one minimal pair: the adverb fela ('only')  has regular stress, while the conjunctive  fela ('but')  (like many other conjunctives) has stress on the final syllable. This is certainly not enough evidence to justify making the claim that Sesotho is a stress accent language, though.

Because the stress falls on the penultimate syllable, Sesotho, like other Bantu languages (and unlike many closely allied Niger–Congo languages), tends to avoid monosyllabic words and often employs certain prefixes and suffixes to make the word disyllabic (such as the syllabic nasal in front of class 9 nouns with monosyllabic stems, etc.).

Notes

References

Clements, G.N, and Rialland, A. 2005. Africa as a Phonological Area. In Bernd Heine & Derek Nurse (eds), Africa as a Linguistic Area. Cambridge: Cambridge University Press.
Dichabe, S. B. 1997. Advanced Tongue Root Harmony in Setswana. M.A. thesis. University of Ottawa. .
 
Hyman, L. M. 2003. Segmental phonology. In D. Nurse & G. Philippson (eds.), The Bantu languages, pp. 42–58. London: Routledge/Curzon.
Schadeberg, T.C. 1994–5. Spirantization and the 7-to-5 Vowel Merger in Bantu''. In Marc Dominicy & Didier Demolin (eds), Sound Change. Belgian Journal of Linguistics, 73–84.

Phonology
Sotho